The Patriotic Bloc was a centre-rightist coalition of parties which ran undisputed in the Sammarinese election of 1923.

The Bloc was dominated by the Sammarinese Fascist Party, and was also composed of the Sammarinese People's Party, the Sammarinese Democratic Union, and the Fascist-puppet Volunteers of War. Threats by Italian fascists prevented any opposition presence, so the Bloc won all the seats to the Grand and General Council. By this means the Fascists took over the country in 1926, with San Marino becoming a one-party state.

See also
Sammarinese general election, 1923

Defunct political party alliances in San Marino
Sammarinese nationalism